Miloš Reljić (Serbian Cyrillic: Милош Рељић; born 12 June 1989) is a Serbian football player.

Club career
He played for the U-19 at Red Star Belgrade before moving out on loan to FK Srem. In 2009 Reljic returned to Red Star Belgrade.

In February 2018, Reljić left FC Ungheni and joined Budućnost Dobanovci. He left the club again in February 2019, before joining FK IMT in the summer 2019, which he left at the end of the year and then returned to Sloga Petrovac in January 2020.

References

External links
 Profile and stats at Srbijafudbal.
 Miloš Reljić Stats at Utakmica.rs
 

Living people
1989 births
Serbian footballers
Serbian expatriate footballers
FK Srem players
Red Star Belgrade footballers
FK BSK Borča players
FK Velež Mostar players
FK Sloga Petrovac na Mlavi players
PFC Lokomotiv Plovdiv players
1. SC Znojmo players
FK Kolubara players
FC Ungheni players
FK Budućnost Dobanovci players
Serbian First League players
Serbian SuperLiga players
First Professional Football League (Bulgaria) players
Ettan Fotboll players
Czech First League players
Association football forwards
Serbian expatriate sportspeople in Bulgaria
Serbian expatriate sportspeople in Sweden
Serbian expatriate sportspeople in the Czech Republic
Serbian expatriate sportspeople in Moldova
Expatriate footballers in Bulgaria
Expatriate footballers in Sweden
Expatriate footballers in the Czech Republic
Expatriate footballers in Moldova